= Zvezdana Popović =

Scientific researcher

Zvezdana Popović, a scientific researcher, was a member of the Founding Committee of the Democratic Party, the first non-communist opposition party in Serbia, from late December 1989.
